SCHWIND eye-tech-solutions GmbH develops, produces and markets devices for the treatment of ametropiae and corneal diseases consisting of laser systems, diagnostic systems, software for individual treatment planning and a microkeratome.

The owner-operated enterprise, based in Kleinostheim near Aschaffenburg, Germany, employs more than 100 people and distributes its products in more than 120 countries worldwide. Customers include ophthalmic surgeons, eye clinics, laser centers and university hospitals.

Three months after announcing its intention to acquire the company, Adagia Partners completed the purchase of Schwind eye-tech-solutions in February 2022 for an undisclosed amount.

History 
Named after its founder, the enterprise was registered in 1958 as Herbert Schwind GmbH & Co. KG in the Aschaffenburg trade register.

Founded in 1964, the subsidiary Titmus Eurocon specialized in the development of contact lenses. In 1972, with the introduction of the first soft contact lenses, Titmus Eurocon brought a world novelty to the market. Titmus Eurocon was sold in 1982 to the Swiss group Ciba Geigy (Novartis).

In the following years, Schwind eye-tech-solutions made a decisive turn from diagnostic technology supplier for ophthalmologic practices to the development of innovative technology in laser systems for refractive and therapeutic corneal surgery.

In 2007 the company introduced a new excimer laser generation, the Schwind Amaris, which is the first and only laser system worldwide to combine all available modern refractive technologies in one system. Since then, the Schwind Amaris product family has been enhanced continuously. Today, Schwind Amaris laser systems compete successfully in a market otherwise dominated by multinational, market-listed corporations. The latest Amaris evolution features, with 1050 Hertz, the second after Optosystems Microscan (1100 Hertz) the highest available pulse repetition rate on the market of excimer lasers today.

In 2013, Schwind concluded an agreement to license the Schwind Amaris platform to the Alphaeon Corporation for marketing and FDA approval in the United States.

SmartSurfACE 

Schwind recently enhanced the Schwind AMARIS firmware to include a new feature called "SmartSurfACE", a laser spot optimization algorithm, developed in conjunction with Dr. David T.C. Lin in Vancouver, Canada.  SmartSurfACE provides for an exceptionally smooth stromal surface post-ablation, which accelerates re-epithelialization and dramatically reduces discomfort.  The results of this stromal smoothing optimization have been nothing short of spectacular, with transepithelial PRK (transPRK) patients seeing better immediately after surgery than they would after one month with a previous treatment algorithm.  In the words of Dr. Lin, Pacific Laser Eye Center, Vancouver, Canada, patients are routinely seeing better immediately after surgery than they did with their glasses prior to surgery.  Third party studies are now confirming the previously published results of the company's consultants.

Awards 
For its innovations, Schwind was awarded various national and international prizes since 2008, for example the German "Industriepreis 2008" in the medical technology category, the "Gusi Peace Prize 2008", the "Medical Design Excellence Award 2008" in Gold as well as the German "TOP 100 most innovative companies 2008" and "Germany Land of Ideas - Selected Landmark 2009" awards.

References

External links 
 Official Website

Companies based in Bavaria
1958 establishments in West Germany
Health care companies established in 1958
Medical technology companies of Germany
Laser medicine
2022 mergers and acquisitions